The Mayor of Little Rock, Arkansas serves as the chief executive of the city government. Little Rock was first incorporated as a town in November 1831 and redefined as a city under a new charter in November 1835. During the American Civil War, Little Rock was captured and occupied by Union forces beginning September 21, 1863, leaving the city without a civilian government until December 1865. Starting in November 1869, the president of the City Council presided over council meetings and signed ordinances, performing many of the duties formerly ascribed to the Mayor. In accordance with new Constitution of Arkansas and new city charter, the Mayor resumed duties previously split between mayor and president of the City Council in March 1875. On November 6, 1956, Little Rock voters approved a move to the City Manager form of government to take effect in the next year and on November 11, 1957, voters selected the first city Board of Directors under the city manager form of government. Under this form, the city board selected Mayor from among its membership to serve for a two-year term. Beginning in 1994, mayors were elected to a four-year term by citywide election.

Trustees (1825–1832)
From October 1825 through January 1832, Little Rock was governed by an elected Board of Trustees. Bernard Smith presided over the board through 1828, Dr. Matthew Cunningham presided in 1829, and John McClain presided in 1830 and 1831.

Mayors (from 1836)

See also
Timeline of Little Rock, Arkansas

References

City of Little Rock City Manager: Mayors of Little Rock

 
Little Rock, Arkansas